Bonelli's Electric Telegraph Co. Ltd. was formed in August 1860 by Henry Cook, an American, of 69 Lincoln's Inn Fields, London, and Eastbourne, with an initial capital of £25,000. The company was formed to exploit the telegraph system of Gaetano Bonelli of Italy, but the firm had limited success, and it failed in 1864.

The company issued a number of telegraph stamps which are of interest to philatelists. It is unclear, however, whether the stamps were ever used as only unused copies are known.

See also
List of historical British telcos

References

Telegraph companies of the United Kingdom
1860 establishments in England
Defunct telecommunications companies of the United Kingdom
British companies established in 1860
Telecommunications companies established in 1860
1864 disestablishments in England
British companies disestablished in 1864
Telecommunications companies disestablished in the 19th century
Technology companies disestablished in 1864